Waacking (also whacking, posing or punking) is a form of street dance created in the LGBTQIA+ clubs of Los Angeles during the 1970s disco era. The style is typically done to 70s disco music and is mainly distinguishable by its rotational arm movements, posing and emphasis on expressiveness.

History 
In the early 1970s a dance style known as punking emerged, with "punk" being a derogatory term for gay men at the time. The term "whack" was a specific movement within the punking style which involved moving the arms over the head in a rhythmic fashion. Although the wider club-going community took part in punking, they did not want the dance to have negative connotations attached to it and therefore renamed the genre "Waackin". Later, Jeffery Daniel added the "g" to waackin to make it "waacking", the name by which the style is commonly known today. The terms 'Whacking' and 'Wacking' are also occasionally used to refer to the dance style.

The originators of waacking were said to have danced to underground and imported Disco music, which was often sped up to create a more energetic atmosphere on the dance floor. The style remained largely underground until it became popularized by the American music-dance television program Soul Train and influenced the creation of Outrageous Waacking Dancers, a Los Angeles-based waacking dance group. Waacking gained renewed attention through the American TV series So You Think You Can Dance in 2011 when a dance routine was choreographed by Kumari Suraj. Over time the dance style has received growing recognition and has been incorporated by dance programs such as the Department for Theatre and Dance at University of South Carolina.

Influences 
As with many other street dance styles that emerged from the late 20th century, waacking picked up various influences from other forms of movement and dance such as jazz, gymnastics and martial arts. Its visual similarities with the dance style locking can be attributed to the fact that both styles were developed around the same period of time in the Los Angeles club scene. The main differences lie within the communities that created them. Whereas waacking was created mainly in LGBT clubs, locking was created by the wider club-going community. Furthermore, the music of the two styles differs, in which waacking uses disco and locking uses funk music.

Another big influence on waacking was Hollywood, whereby dancers took inspiration stylistically from movie stars such as Lauren Bacall, Marlene Dietrich, Bette Davis and James Dean. These inspirations manifested themselves not only through the movements and poses but also through other aspects of the dance such as dress styles and facial expressions.

In modern pop culture, the style of dance is famously likened to the movements of the character Garnet in the cartoon show Steven Universe as a catalyst for many of her magical powers, including summoning magical weapons and fusing with other characters.

See also
 Locking (dance)
 Vogue (dance)

References

External links 

Disco
LGBT dance